Sully v. Drennan, 113 U.S. 287 (1885), was an appeal from an order of the Circuit Court for the Southern District of Iowa in the United States remanding to the state court a case which had been removed from the state into the circuit court. 

The suit was brought originally in the district court of the state by James N. Drennan and others, taxpayers of Prairie Township, in the County of Mahaska.

Allegations
The allegations of the bill for this case were that on May 11, 1880, the voters of said township voted a tax of three percent upon the taxable property of said township to aid in constructing a railroad by a company whose name was afterwards lawfully changed to that of the Chicago, Burlington and Pacific Railroad Company. That by the order and notice submitting the question to vote, it was provided that one-half of the tax should be collected the first year and one-half the second year; the said road to be fully completed and running to a depot within the Sharon, Iowa, in said township, before the tax is due and collectible by the said railroad company, and if not built within two years from the day of the election, said tax never to be collectible. That the railroad was not completed to a depot in Sharon within two years from the date of the vote. That it was not completed from Sharon to any other town.

That Morgan, president of the railroad company and another director, pending the consideration of the matter by the voters, made false and fraudulent representations to them that the company had arrangements with the Chicago, Burlington and Quincy Railroad Company, and the Chicago, Milwaukee and St. Paul Railroad Company, by which either of these companies would build and equip the road to the Town of Sharon as soon as the tax was voted. That the railroad company, by its officers and agents, are demanding of the trustees of the township that they certify to the County Treasurer of Mahaska County that the conditions required by said vote have been complied with, and are threatening, by suits against them and otherwise, to compel them to make such certificate, and petitioners fear that said trustees will yield and make the certificate unless restrained by the act of the court.

They averred that one Alfred Sully claims some interest in the tax, and ask that he be made a party to the suit so that he may be estopped by the judgment. They said the tax is illegal and void for many reasons, and prayed for an injunction against the trustees from certifying to the county treasurer that the conditions of the vote have been complied with, and the county treasurer, John H. Warren, and his successor in office, and the Chicago, Burlington and Pacific Railroad Company, and Alfred Sully, from in any manner attempting to collect said tax or from endeavoring to procure said certificate from the trustees of Prairie Township.

The notice, which in the Iowa practice stands for the original writ, was returnable to the May term, 1883, and service acknowledged by the trustees and treasurer on 20th day of March, and on the railroad company, March 29. The day required for the appearance and pleading of the defendants was May 11.

Injunction
A temporary injunction was granted September 13, 1883. It seems that on 15th day of May, the case was, by order of the judge of the district court, who had been of counsel in it, transferred to the circuit court of the same county, the judge of which granted the injunction. At the October term of this Court, all the parties, including Sully, who had not been served with notice, appeared. A demurrer was interposed by Sully, and overruled. Many motions were made and decided about the pleadings, and the railroad company, Sully, and Warren filed a joint answer denying the right to the relief prayed. The pleadings were finally made up at this term. 

At the next term of that court, in May, the application of Sully to remove the case into the United States court was made on the ground that he was a citizen of the State of New York, and all the other parties were citizens of Iowa. He claimed to have an assignment from the railroad company of the right to the taxes. The state court refused to make the order, and Sully took a transcript of the record and filed it in the Circuit Court for the Southern District of Iowa. When the attention of that court was called to the matter, the case was remanded to the state court, and from that order this appeal is taken.

Opinion of the Court

Justice Miller delivered the opinion of the Court. He recited the facts as above stated and continued:

We think the order remanding the case was well made.

1. Mr. Sully is the only defendant who is not a citizen of Iowa. The other defendants, against whom relief is sought, are the railroad company, the trustees of Prairie Township, and the treasurer of the county. All of these are proper parties, and are necessary parties against whom positive and affirmative relief is sought.

Without deciding whether the railroad company could assign the right to sue for and enforce these taxes to Mr. Sully, it is sufficient to say that the assignment did not carry that right to him discharged of the equities between the company and the taxpayers, as if they had been negotiable bonds. To any suit, therefore, to invalidate this tax the company was a necessary party. It is especially so in equity, where the matter set up to defeat the tax, as in this case, was the failure of the company to comply with the conditions of the vote, and its false and fraudulent representations by which the vote was secured. In such a suit, the company has a right to defend against these allegations, and the plaintiffs have a right that the company shall be bound by the judgment in the case. The interest of Sully and the company in this controversy are the same, and are both opposed to the interests of plaintiffs. This railroad company is organized under the laws of Iowa, and is a citizen of that state as well as plaintiffs.

2. The township trustees are also citizens of Iowa. These are not nominal parties, and their interest is not identical with that of plaintiffs. What may be their personal wishes is not known, nor is it material. They are sued in regard to their official position to restrain them in the threatened exercise of their official authority, to the prejudice of plaintiffs. The exercise of this power lies at the root of plaintiffs' case, and of defendants' rights. The statute of Iowa which authorizes this vote by a township declares that the money collected under it, shall be paid out by the county treasurer

at any time after the trustees of the township, or a majority of them, shall have certified to the county treasurer that the conditions required of the railroad and set forth in the notice for the special election at which the tax was voted, have been complied with.

Until this is done, no right to the money accrues to the railroad company, or anyone else. The act here required of the trustees is not a mere ministerial one. It requires them to ascertain and decide what was required of the company by the notice, with the meaning of its terms, and, when they have construed these, to ascertain as a matter of fact whether they have been complied with.

So important is this action to Sully and to the railroad company that the bill alleges they are seeking to drive them to make the certificate by threats of expensive litigation, and it is said in the brief that Sully has resorted already to a writ of mandamus. Are these trustees nominal parties? Are they, in their official action, on the same side of this controversy with plaintiffs? If they were, there would be no necessity to sue out an injunction to prevent them from issuing this certificate. If there is any nominal party, or any party unnecessary to the relief sought by plaintiffs, it is Sully, for if plaintiffs can procure a decree enjoining the trustees from making that certificate, their relief is sufficient, if not complete. So of the treasurer, Warren, who, so far from siding with plaintiffs in the suit, has joined Sully and the railroad company in a demurrer to the bill, and in his answer denies the merits.

The case of Harter v. Kernochan, 103 U. S. 562, is cited in opposition to this view of the case. But in that case, negotiable bonds had been issued and were in the hands of Kernochan as a bona fide holder. The case between him and the township of Harter was a very different one from the present case. In that case, the whole right was vested in Kernochan, and the whole matter in controversy could be determined between him and the township. In the suit as brought in the state court in that case, the officers who were served with the writ made default, and a notice by publication against the unknown owner of the bonds being unanswered, a default was taken against them, and a decree made enjoining all proceedings to collect the bonds. Under a statutory provision, Kernochan came in due time and, alleging himself to be a holder of the bonds, the default as to the unknown owner was set aside and he was permitted to answer. As to the other defendants, they were now out of the case, and Kernochan being a citizen of another state, removed the case into the circuit court of the United States.

The difference between the two cases was obvious.

The judgment of the circuit court, remanding the case, was affirmed.

See also
List of United States Supreme Court cases, volume 113

References

External links
 

United States Supreme Court cases
United States Supreme Court cases of the Waite Court
1885 in United States case law